Tyler Kali Yates (born August 7, 1977) is an American former professional baseball pitcher. He played in Major League Baseball for the New York Mets, Atlanta Braves, and Pittsburgh Pirates.

Career

Oakland Athletics/New York Mets
Yates attended the University of Hawaii at Hilo before being drafted by the Oakland Athletics in the 23rd round of the 1998 Major League Baseball Draft. Yates pitched in the Athletics organization until being traded to the New York Mets with Mark Guthrie in December 2001, for David Justice. His 2002 season was limited by Tommy John surgery.

Yates split the 2003 season between three minor league teams. He participated in spring training the next year, and debuted against the Montreal Expos on April 9, 2004. Ten days later, Yates earned his first major league victory in another appearance against Montreal. By May, Yates had returned to the minor leagues to pitch as a reliever. Yates underwent rotator cuff surgery and did not pitch during the 2005 season.

Atlanta Braves/Pittsburgh Pirates
Yates was released by the Mets at the conclusion of the 2005 season, and joined the Baltimore Orioles before the 2006 season, participating in spring training as a non-roster invitee. He was subsequently released from the Orioles, and signed with the Atlanta Braves on May 3, 2006. Yates recorded the first save of his career on July 14, 2006, in a 15–12 extra-inning win over the San Diego Padres. He made the Braves Opening Day roster in 2007, and agreed to terms with the team prior to the start of the 2008 season, then was traded to the Pittsburgh Pirates on March 26, 2008, in exchange for minor league pitcher Todd Redmond.

Yates missed the second half of the 2009 season after having a second Tommy John procedure, performed by James Andrews, in July. He was re-signed to a minor league deal on January 4, 2010, but not expected to pitch until May or June. He returned to the Pirates organization for the 2011 season, and participated in spring training, until being cut from major league camp in March.

Personal
Tyler is the eldest of three brothers, including Spencer and Kirby Yates. Tyler and Kirby were the second pair of brothers from Hawaii to play Major League Baseball, after Bronson and Dane Sardinha. Since retiring from baseball, Tyler became a police officer in Kauai. Tyler dated Liesel throughout his professional baseball career. The two later married and had two children.

References

External links

"Yates to Speak at UH-Hilo Fundraiser"

Major League Baseball pitchers
New York Mets players
Atlanta Braves players
Pittsburgh Pirates players
Arizona League Athletics players
Southern Oregon Timberjacks players
Visalia Oaks players
Modesto A's players
Midland RockHounds players
Sacramento River Cats players
Norfolk Tides players
St. Lucie Mets players
Binghamton Mets players
Richmond Braves players
Hawaii–Hilo Vulcans baseball players
Baseball players from Hawaii
People from Kauai County, Hawaii
1977 births
Living people
American police officers